The British film industry produced over four hundred feature films in 2011. This article fully lists all non-pornographic films, including short films, that had a release date in that year and which were at least partly made by the United Kingdom. It does not include films first released in previous years that had release dates in 2011.   Also included is an overview of the major events in British film, including film festivals and awards ceremonies, as well as lists of those films that have been particularly well received, both critically and financially. The year was particularly notable for the release of Harry Potter and the Deathly Hallows: Part II, the final instalment in the Harry Potter film franchise.

Major releases

January – March

April – June

July – September

October – December

Co-productions

Of the 128 major British releases of 2011, 58 were co-productions with at least one other country. As with other years, the largest number of co-productions were made with the United States, with 30 films. They are listed in full below.

Critical reception

Listed here are the top ten best and worst British films of those released in 2011, and listed above as major releases, as per the review aggregator websites Rotten Tomatoes and Metacritic. Both the critical scores for Rotten Tomatoes are out of a maximum score of 100, as is the critical score for Metacritic. Films not listed on a particular website, or that do not yet have a certain score, do not appear in the corresponding list.

Rotten Tomatoes

Metacritic

British award winners

Academy Awards
The 83rd Academy Awards honoring the best films of 2010 were held on 27 February 2011.

British winners:

 Inception (Best Sound Editing, Best Sound Mixing, Best Cinematography, Best Visual Effects)
 The King's Speech (Best Picture, Best Director, Best Actor, Best Original Screenplay)
 Andrew Lockley (Best Visual Effects) – Inception
 Chris Corbould (Best Visual Effects) – Inception
 Christian Bale (Best Supporting Actor) – The Fighter
 Colin Firth (Best Actor) – The King's Speech
 Dave Elsey (Best Makeup) – The Wolfman
 David Seidler (Best Original Screenplay) – The King's Speech
 Gareth Unwin (Best Picture) – The King's Speech
 Kevin Brownlow (Academy Honorary Award)
 Paul Franklin (Best Visual Effects) – Inception
 Tom Hooper (Best Director) – The King's Speech

British nominations:

 127 Hours (Best Picture, Best Actor, Best Adapted Screenplay, Best Original Score, Best Original Song, Best Film Editing)
 Another Year (Best Original Screenplay)
 Exit Through the Gift Shop (Best Documentary Feature)
 Harry Potter and the Deathly Hallows: Part 1 (Best Art Direction, Best Visual Effects)
 Inception (Best Picture, Best Original Screenplay, Best Original Score, Best Art Direction)
 The Confession (Best Live Action Short Film)
 The Gruffalo (Best Animated Short Film)
 The King's Speech (Best Supporting Actor, Best Supporting Actress, Best Original Score, Best Sound Mixing, Best Art Direction, Best Cinematography, Best Costume Design, Best Film Editing)
 The Illusionist (Best Animated Feature)
 Waste Land (Best Documentary Feature)
 Wish 143 (Best Live Action Short Film)
 Banksy (Best Documentary Feature) – Exit Through the Gift Shop
 Christian Colson (Best Picture) – 127 Hours
 Christopher Nolan (Best Picture, Best Original Screenplay) – Inception
 Danny Boyle (Best Picture, Best Adapted Screenplay) – 127 Hours
 Danny Cohen (Best Cinematography) – The King's Speech
 Dido Armstrong (Best Original Song) – 127 Hours
 Emma Thomas (Best Picture) – Inception
 Eve Stewart (Best Art Direction) – The King's Speech
 Guy Hendrix Dyas (Best Art Direction) – Inception
 Helena Bonham Carter (Best Supporting Actress) – The King's Speech
 Jenny Beavan (Best Costume Design) – The King's Speech
 John Midgley (Best Sound Mixing) – The King's Speech
 John Powell (Best Original Score) – How to Train Your Dragon
 John Richardson (Best Visual Effects) – Harry Potter and the Deathly Hallows: Part 1
 Jon Harris (Best Film Editing) – 127 Hours
 Judy Farr (Best Art Direction) – The King's Speech
 Lucy Walker (Best Documentary Feature) – Wish 143
 Mike Leigh (Best Original Screenplay) – Another Year
 Paul Hamblin (Best Sound Mixing) – The King's Speech
 Rollo Armstrong (Best Original Song) – 127 Hours
 Roger Deakins (Best Cinematography) – True Grit
 Sandy Powell (Best Costume Design) – The Tempest
 Simon Beaufoy (Best Adapted Screenplay) – 127 Hours
 Stephenie McMillan (Best Art Direction) – Harry Potter and the Deathly Hallows: Part 1
 Stuart Craig (Best Art Direction) – Harry Potter and the Deathly Hallows: Part 1
 Tim Hetherington (Best Documentary Feature) – Restrepo

British Academy Film Awards
The 64th British Academy Film Awards were held on 13 February 2011.

British winners:

 Four Lions (Outstanding Debut by a British Writer, Director or Producer)
 Inception (Best Sound, Best Production Design, Best Special Visual Effects)
 The Eagleman Stag (Best Short Animation)
 The King's Speech (Best Film, Best Actor in a Leading Role, Best Actor in a Supporting Role, Best Actress in a Supporting Role, Best Original Screenplay, Outstanding British Film, Best Original Music)
 Andrew Lockley (Best Special Visual Effects) – Inception
 Chris Corbould (Best Special Visual Effects) – Inception
 Chris Morris (Outstanding Debut by a British Writer, Director or Producer) – Four Lions
 Christopher Lee (Academy Fellowship)
 Colin Firth (Best Actor in a Leading Role) – The King's Speech
 David Seidler (Best Original Screenplay) – The King's Speech
 Guy Hendrix Dyas (Best Production Design) – Inception
 Helena Bonham Carter (Best Actress in a Supporting Role) – The King's Speech
 Michael Please (Best Short Animation) – The Eagleman Stag
 Paul Franklin (Best Special Visual Effects) – Inception
 Roger Deakins (Best Cinematography) – True Grit
 Tom Hardy (Orange Rising Star Award)
 Harry Potter film series (Outstanding British Contribution to Cinema)

British nominations:

 127 Hours (Best Director, Best Actor in a Leading Role, Best Adapted Screenplay, Best Cinematography, Outstanding British Film, Best Original Music, Best Sound, Best Editing)
 Another Year (Best Actress in a Supporting Role, Outstanding British Film)
 Exit Through the Gift Shop (Outstanding Debut by a British Writer, Director or Producer)
 Four Lions (Outstanding British Film)
 Harry Potter and the Deathly Hallows: Part 1 (Best Special Visual Effects, Best Makeup and Hair)
 Inception (Best Film, Best Director, Best Original Screenplay, Best Cinematography, Best Original Music, Best Editing)
 Made in Dagenham (Best Actress in a Supporting Role, Outstanding British Film, Best Costume Design, Best Makeup and Hair)
 Monsters (Outstanding Debut by a British Writer, Director or Producer)
 Skeletons (Outstanding Debut by a British Writer, Director or Producer)
 The Arbor (Outstanding Debut by a British Writer, Director or Producer)
 The King's Speech (Best Director, Best Cinematography, Best Sound, Best Production Design, Best Costume Design, Best Makeup and Hair, Best Editing)
 Aaron Taylor-Johnson (Orange Rising Star Award)
 Andrew Garfield (Best Actor in a Supporting Role, Orange Rising Star Award) – The Social Network
 Anthony Dod Mantle (Best Cinematography) – 127 Hours
 Banksy (Outstanding Debut by a British Writer, Director or Producer) – Exit Through the Gift Shop
 Christian Bale (Best Actor in a Supporting Role) – The Fighter
 Christopher Nolan (Best Director, Best Original Screenplay) – Inception
 Clio Barnard (Outstanding Debut by a British Writer, Director or Producer) – The Arbor
 Danny Boyle (Best Director, Best Adapted Screenplay) – 127 Hours
 Danny Cohen (Best Cinematography) – The King's Speech
 Eve Stewart (Best Production Design) – The King's Speech
 Gareth Edwards (Outstanding Debut by a British Writer, Director or Producer) – Monsters
 Gemma Arterton (Orange Rising Star Award)
 Glenn Freemantle (Best Sound) – 127 Hours
 Ian Tapp (Best Sound) – 127 Hours
 Jaimie D'Cruz (Outstanding Debut by a British Writer, Director or Producer) – Exit Through the Gift Shop
 Jenny Beavan (Best Costume Design) – The King's Speech
 John Midgley (Best Sound) – The King's Speech
 John Powell (Best Original Score) – How to Train Your Dragon
 Julianne Moore (Best Actress in a Leading Role) – The Kids Are All Right
 Lesley Manville (Best Actress in a Supporting Role) – Another Year
 Miranda Richardson (Best Actress in a Supporting Role) – Made in Dagenham
 Nick Whitfield (Outstanding Debut by a British Writer, Director or Producer) – Skeletons
 Paul Hamblin (Best Sound) – The King's Speech
 Pete Postlethwaite (Best Actor in a Supporting Role) – The Town
 Richard Pryke (Best Sound) – 127 Hours
 Samuel Abrahams (Best Short Film) – Connect
 Simon Beaufoy (Best Adapted Screenplay) – 127 Hours
 Tom Hooper (Best Director) – The King's Speech

Critics' Choice Awards

The 16th Critics' Choice Awards were held on 14 January 2011.

British winners:

 127 Hours (Best Song)
 Inception (Best Cinematography, Best Art Direction, Best Editing, Best Visual Effects, Best Sound, Best Action Movie)
 The King's Speech (Best Actor, Best Original Screenplay)
 Christian Bale (Best Supporting Actor) – The Fighter
 Colin Firth (Best Actor) – The King's Speech
 David Seidler (Best Original Screenplay) – The King's Speech
 Dido Armstrong (Best Song) – 127 Hours
 Guy Hendrix Dyas (Best Art Direction) – Inception
 Rollo Armstrong (Best Song) – 127 Hours

British nominations:

 127 Hours (Best Picture, Best Actor, Best Director, Best Adapted Screenplay, Best Cinematography, Best Editing, Best Sound)
 Another Year (Best Original Screenplay)
 Exit Through the Gift Shop (Best Documentary Feature)
 Harry Potter and the Deathly Hallows: Part 1 (Best Makeup, Best Visual Effects)
 Inception (Best Picture, Best Director, Best Original Screenplay, Best Score)
 Kick-Ass (Best Young Actor/Actress, Best Action Movie)
 Let Me In (Best Young Actor/Actress)
 Somewhere (Best Young Actor/Actress)
 The Illusionist (Best Animated Feature)
 The King's Speech (Best Picture, Best Supporting Actor, Best Supporting Actress, Best Acting Ensemble, Best Director, Best Cinematography, Best Art Direction, Best Costume Design, Best Score)
 Andrew Garfield (Best Supporting Actor) – The Social Network
 Anthony Dod Mantle (Best Cinematography) – 127 Hours
 Christopher Nolan (Best Director, Best Original Screenplay) – Inception
 Clint Mansell (Best Score) – Black Swan
 Danny Boyle (Best Director, Best Adapted Screenplay) – 127 Hours
 Danny Cohen (Best Cinematography) – The King's Speech
 Helena Bonham Carter (Best Supporting Actress) – The King's Speech
 Jenny Beavan (Best Costume Design) – The King's Speech
 Jon Harris (Best Editing) – 127 Hours
 Mike Leigh (Best Original Screenplay) – Another Year
 Roger Deakins (Best Cinematography) – True Grit
 Tom Hooper (Best Director) – The King's Speech

Golden Globe Awards
The 68th Golden Globe Awards were held on 16 January 2011.

British winners:

 Christian Bale (Best Supporting Actor) – The Fighter
 Colin Firth (Best Actor – Motion Picture Drama) – The King's Speech

British nominations:

 127 Hours (Best Screenplay)
 Inception (Best Motion Picture – Drama, Best Director, Best Screenplay)
 The Chronicles of Narnia: The Voyage of the Dawn Treader (Best Original Song)
 The Illusionist (Best Animated Feature)
 The King's Speech (Best Motion Picture – Drama, Best Director, Best Screenplay, Best Supporting Actor, Best Supporting Actress)
 Andrew Garfield (Best Supporting Actor) – The Social Network
 Christopher Nolan (Best Director, Best Screenplay) – Inception
 Danny Boyle (Best Screenplay) – 127 Hours
 David Seidler (Best Screenplay) – The King's Speech
 Helena Bonham Carter (Best Supporting Actress) – The King's Speech
 Julianne Moore (Best Actress – Motion Picture Musical or Comedy) – The Kids Are All Right
 Simon Beaufoy (Best Screenplay) – 127 Hours
 Tom Hooper (Best Director) – The King's Speech

Screen Actors Guild Awards
The 17th Screen Actors Guild Awards were held on 30 January 2011.

British winners:

 Inception (Outstanding Performance by a Stunt Ensemble in a Motion Picture)
 The King's Speech (Outstanding Performance by a Male Actor in a Leading Role, Outstanding Performance by a Cast in a Motion Picture)
 Anthony Andrews (Outstanding Performance by a Cast in a Motion Picture) – The King's Speech
 Christian Bale (Outstanding Performance by a Male Actor in a Supporting Role) – The Fighter
 Claire Bloom (Outstanding Performance by a Cast in a Motion Picture) – The King's Speech
 Colin Firth (Outstanding Performance by a Male Actor in a Leading Role, Outstanding Performance by a Cast in a Motion Picture) – The King's Speech
 Derek Jacobi (Outstanding Performance by a Cast in a Motion Picture) – The King's Speech
 Guy Pearce (Outstanding Performance by a Cast in a Motion Picture) – The King's Speech
 Helena Bonham Carter (Outstanding Performance by a Cast in a Motion Picture) – The King's Speech
 Jennifer Ehle (Outstanding Performance by a Cast in a Motion Picture) – The King's Speech
 Michael Gambon (Outstanding Performance by a Cast in a Motion Picture) – The King's Speech
 Timothy Spall (Outstanding Performance by a Cast in a Motion Picture) – The King's Speech

British nominations:

 127 Hours (Outstanding Performance by a Male Actor in a Leading Role)
 Green Zone (Outstanding Performance by a Stunt Ensemble in a Motion Picture)
 Robin Hood (Outstanding Performance by a Stunt Ensemble in a Motion Picture)
 The King's Speech (Outstanding Performance by a Male Actor in a Supporting Role, Outstanding Performance by a Female Actor in a Supporting Role)
 Andrew Garfield (Outstanding Performance by a Cast in a Motion Picture) – The Social Network
 Christian Bale (Outstanding Performance by a Cast in a Motion Picture) – The Fighter
 Helena Bonham Carter (Outstanding Performance by a Female Actor in a Supporting Role) – The King's Speech
 Julianne Moore (Outstanding Performance by a Cast in a Motion Picture) – The Kids Are All Right
 Max Minghella (Outstanding Performance by a Cast in a Motion Picture) – The Social Network

See also
 2011 in film
 2011 in British music
 2011 in British radio
 2011 in British television
 2011 in the United Kingdom
 List of 2011 box office number-one films in the United Kingdom
 List of British films of 2010
 List of British films of 2012

External links
 

2011
Films
Lists of 2011 films by country or language